Simalkha (Simalkhan as in Land Records with Tehsil Koshyan Kutoli)  is a village in Betalghat Mandal in Nainital district in Uttarakhand State in India. It has 67.63700 hectare  land. Simalkha is 23.9 km distance from its District main city Nainital and 153 km distance from its State Main City Dehradun.

Simalkha is situated on a link road 16 km away from NH-87. Geographical coordinates are 29.510452,79.426163.

Betalghat, Amel, Bajedi, Bargal, Basgoan and Bhawaligaon are the villages along with this village in the same Betalghat Development Block .

Nearby towns are Kotabag (19.6 km), Ramgarh (23.7 km), Nainital (46 km) and Ramnagar (30 km).

Other villages near Simalkha are Dhaniakot, Dolkot and Gairkhav.

Places to visit near Simalkha are Nainital, Bhimtal, Ranikhet and Almora.

External links
 Simalkha on Google Maps

Villages in Nainital district